Thomas Michael Hagedorn (born November 27, 1943) is  an American politician who served in the United States House of Representatives as a Republican from Minnesota.

Early life and education
He was born in Blue Earth, Faribault County, Minnesota, on November 27, 1943 and graduated from the Blue Earth High School in 1961.

Career
Hagedorn served in the United States Navy in 1961. After returning to Minnesota, he engaged in grain and livestock farming in Watonwan County. He served as a member of the Minnesota House of Representatives from 1971 to 1975 and was a delegate to the Minnesota State and County Republican conventions in 1968 and 1972, and the national Republican conventions in 1976 and 1980. He was elected as a Republican to represent Minnesota's 2nd congressional district in the 94th, 95th, 96th, and 97th congresses, serving from January 3, 1975, to January 3, 1983. He was an unsuccessful candidate for reelection to represent Minnesota's 1st congressional district in the 98th congress in 1982. Hagedorn was succeeded in the House by author, businessman, and musician Tim Penny.

Family
Hagedorn's son Jim Hagedorn was elected to Congress in 2018 from Minnesota's 1st congressional district, which contained much of the same territory Tom Hagedorn had represented.

References

External links

|-

|-

|-

1943 births
Living people
20th-century American politicians
Farmers from Minnesota
Republican Party members of the Minnesota House of Representatives
Military personnel from Minnesota
People from Blue Earth, Minnesota
Republican Party members of the United States House of Representatives from Minnesota
United States Navy sailors